Amelung may refer to;

any member of the Amal dynasty
Ed Amelung (b. 1959), American baseball outfielder
Friedrich Amelung (1842–1909), Baltic German cultural historian, businessman and chess player. 
Günter Amelung (1914–1944), German World War II officer 
Heinz-Günter Amelung (1917–1964), German World War II Luftwaffe officer 
John Frederick Amelung (1741–1798), German-American glass artist
Walther Amelung (1865–1927), German archaeologist